Mario Pasik (born 3 March 1951) is an Argentine actor.  He is most known for TV series Son de Fierro (2007), Endless Summer (1998) and Champs 12 (2009).

Biography
He was born on 3 March 1951 in Versalles, Buenos Aires, and is the son of a merchant father and a housewife mother. His family later moved to Villa Crespo. He is younger brother of the actor Salo Pasik (1945-2017).

Career
He made his acting debut when he was 13 years old, performing in Historias para recounted, a work by the Argentinean Osvaldo Dragún and then in Petition by Antón Chéjov.

He studied theater with actor Raúl Serrano. He performed in the 'Cristal Sun' with Inda Ledesma, Jorge Marrale, Alicia Bruzzo and Rodolfo Bebán.

He has performed in films such as Contraluz (2001), The Face of the Angel (1998), The Salt in the Wound (1996), Of my neighborhood with love (1995) and Where are you my love? life that I can not find you? (1992), among many others.

In 2007, he performed in 5 episodes of the television-novel 'Tango del Ultimo Amor', a co-production of Telefé and the Russian channel 'TV Channel Russia', made exclusively for that country, he co-starred with Adriana Salonia.

Theatrical productions
 Autumn Garden (actor)
 Contractions (actor)
 For a yes or a no (actor)
 The puzzle bag (actor)
 Segovia (or De la poesía) (actor, directed by Villanueva Cosse)

Selected filmography
 1986  Another love story (or Orta historia de amor) as Jorge Castro 
 1991	The Last Harvest as Patrick
 1992	¿Dónde estás amor de mi vida que no te puedo encontrar? (or Where are you love of my life that I can not find you?) as Federico
 1995	Más allá del límite (or Beyond the limit) as Inspector Bechara
 1995	From my neighborhood with love as Julián
 1996	The Salt in the Wound (or El Dedo en la llaga) as Irazábal 
 2001	Backlighted as Alejandro
 2015	Pasaje de Vida (Passage of life) as Antonio

Selected television
 1978	Un mundo de veinte asientos (or 'A world of twenty seats') as Marcelo
 1980	Trampa para un soñador (or 'Trap for a dreamer') as Jorge Luis	
 1985	Extraños y amantes (or 'Strangers and lovers') as Manuel Spil (TV series)
 1989	El duende azul (or 'The Blue Goblin') as Marcelo
 1992	Desde adentro as César Bermúdez
 1994	Nano (or 'Elder brother') as Silvio Canelo
 1996	Como pan caliente (or 'Like hot bread') as Horacio
 1998-1999 Verano del '98 (or 'Endless Summer') as Germán Villanueva
 2000	Vulnerable as Osvaldo
 2001	Young Lovers as Arturo Miguens (telenovela) 
 2002	Sweethearts as Guillermo Carmona (telenovela) 
 2005	Una familia especial (or 'A special family') as Hermes Schneider
 2006	Tango of the last love as George
 2006	Monte Cristo as Horacio Díaz Herrera
 2007	Son de Fierro as José María Fontana
 2007	El hombre que volvió de la muerte (or 'The man who returned from death') as Blanco Morel (14 episodes)
 2009	Champs 12 as Renzo Carresi (127 episodes)
 2010	Ciega a citas as Augusto (TV Series) 
 2011	When you smile as Juan Primero Murfi (78 episodes)
 2012	Graduates as Richi (3 episodes)
 2013	Historias de corazón (or 'Heart stories') as Manuel (2 episodes)
 2013	Los vecinos en guerra (or 'The neighbors in war') as Miguel Del Río (62 episodes)
 2013	Farsantes as Miguel Ángel Mendoza (5 episodes)
 2013	Qitapenas as Douglas Morris (4 episodes)
 2016	Círculos (or 'Circles') as Don Federico
 2017	Quiero vivir a tu lado (or'I want to live next to you') as Eugenio Justo (74 episodes)
 2017	El Jardín de Bronce (or'The bronze garden') as Careers (8 episodes)
 2018	100 días para enamorarse (or 'One hundred days to fall in love') as Miguel Contempomi

Personnel life
He had been married to actress Marta Betoldi since 1992, they have two children (Manuel and Nicolás), they then separated in 2013.
He likes macrobiotic food.

Award nominations
 2013 Martín Fierro Awards
 Best secondary actor

References

1951 births
Argentine male actors
20th-century Argentine male actors
People from Buenos Aires
Living people